Printemps et autres saisons is the title of a collection of short stories written in French by French Nobel laureate J. M. G. Le Clézio .

Contents
 Printemps
 Fascination
 Le temps ne passe pas
 Zinna
 La saison des pluies (which has been translated as "The Rainy Season") Excerpt online

Reviews
Le monde review
This blog is closing, so the note is now available on http://argoul.com/2011/03/21/le-clezio-printemps-et-autres-saisons/

Publication history

First French Edition

Second French Edition

"La saison des pluies"

Nouvelle Revue Française

I.

fin

References

1989 short story collections
Short story collections by J. M. G. Le Clézio
Works by J. M. G. Le Clézio